Graffiti Blues is an album by American trumpeter Blue Mitchell recorded in 1973 and released on the Mainstream label.

Reception
The Allmusic review by Scott Yanow awarded the album 3 stars stating "Although not up to the same level as Blue Mitchell's earlier Blue Note dates, this accessible set does a good job of balancing worthwhile solos with catchy rhythms and has dated surprisingly well".

Track listing
 "Graffiti Blues" (Blue Mitchell) - 7:16 
 "Yeah Ya Right" (Herman Riley) - 5:29 
 "Express" (Blue Mitchell) - 5:06 
 "Asso-Kam" (Joe Sample) - 7:24 
 "Dorado" (Joe Sample) - 8:59
 "Alone Again (Naturally)" (Gilbert O'Sullivan) - 3:24 Bonus track on CD reissue 
 "Where It's At" (David Matthews) - 3:31 Bonus track on CD reissue  
 "Funky Walk" (David Matthews) - 4:33 Bonus track on CD reissue  
 "Blue Funk" (David Matthews) - 4:38 Bonus track on CD reissue  
Recorded at the Record Plant in Los Angeles, California on March 1, 1973.

Personnel
Blue Mitchell - trumpet
Don Bailey - harmonica
Herman Riley - flute, tenor saxophone
Freddy Robinson - guitar
Joe Sample - piano, electric piano 
Walter Bishop, Jr. - piano
Darrell Clayborn - electric bass
Raymond Pounds - drums

References

Mainstream Records albums
Blue Mitchell albums
1973 albums
Albums produced by Bob Shad